The decade of the 1300s in art involved some significant events.

Events
 1300: Giotto completes the Badia Polyptych
 1303: Scrovegni Chapel begun in 1300, is completed. Giotto begins painting a fresco cycle there with scenes from the Old and New Testaments
 1305: Giotto completes the fresco cycle for the Scrovegni Chapel

Works

 c. 1300–05: Giovanni da Rimini paints his Diptych, Scenes from the Lives of the Virgin and other Saints and Scenes from the Life of Christ
 1300: Duccio paints Stoclet Madonna on a wooden panel
 1307: Gaddo Gaddi completes the Coronation of the Virgin mosaic over the inside door of Florence Cathedral

Births
 1308: Orcagna – Italian painter, sculptor, and architect active in Florence (died 1368)
 1308: Wáng Méng – Chinese painter during the Yuan dynasty (died 1385)
 1306: Giovanni da Santo Stefano da Ponte – Italian painter of portraits and devotional subjects (died 1365)
 1302: Fang Congyi – Chinese painter in Yuan Dynasty (died 1393)
 1301: Stefano Fiorentino –  Italian fresco painter (died 1350)
 1301: Ni Zan – Chinese artist considered to be one of the four "Late Yuan" masters (died 1374)
 1300: Peter Parler – German architect, best known for building Saint Vitus Cathedral and Charles Bridge in Prague (died 1399)
 1300: Jean Pucelle – Parisian Gothic-era manuscript illuminator (died 1355)
 1300: Francesco Talenti – Italian sculptor and architect (died 1369)

Deaths
 1300/1310: Arnolfo di Cambio – Italian architect and sculptor (born 1240)
 1302: Cimabue – Italian painter and creator of mosaics from Florence (born 1240)
 1303: Deodato Cosmati – Roman architect and sculptor, and worker in decorative geometric mosaic (born 1225)
 1305: Qián Xuǎn – Chinese Song loyalist painter from Zhejiang during the Southern Song (born 1235)
 1306: Araniko – Nepalese painter and architect (born 1245)
 1307: Gong Kai – Chinese government official and later scholar-amateur painter (born 1222)

 
Years of the 14th century in art
Art